William Ragsdale (born January 19, 1961) is an American actor known for playing teenaged vampire slayer Charley Brewster in the horror vampire film Fright Night (1985) and Herman Brooks in the television series Herman's Head (1991–94).

Early life and education
Ragsdale was born January 19, 1961, in El Dorado, Arkansas, and attended Hendrix College, where he appeared in plays alongside Natalie Canerday.

Career 
He garnered attention as the young hero of Fright Night and Fright Night Part 2 and onstage in Neil Simon's plays Brighton Beach Memoirs and Biloxi Blues, two of the three parts of Simon's trilogy, which ends with Broadway Bound. Ragsdale featured in the romance comedy movie Mannequin Two: On the Move (1991).

Ragsdale has had a sporadic career with regard to prime-time television. He featured for three years on Herman's Head. He had a brief recurring role in the television series Judging Amy. He played a television producer for Grosse Pointe, which lasted one season.

He was cast in the pilot for Charmed, but refused the series to feature in the short-lived situation comedy Brother's Keeper. He appeared on Ellen as the boyfriend of Ellen Morgan (played by Ellen DeGeneres) before her character revealed her homosexuality. He has had guest roles on television, including a four-episode stint on Less than Perfect, as well as small feature movie roles.

He played the role of Gary Hawkins in 12 episodes of the television series Justified from March 2010 through March 2012, during the series' first three seasons.  In 2014, he played Chris Smith in the remake of the movie Left Behind.

In 2017, he appeared in the role of Reverend Todd in the Off-Broadway production of Man from Nebraska at the Second Stage Theatre.

Filmography

Film

Television

References

External links

 
 
 

1961 births
American male film actors
American male television actors
Living people
Male actors from Arkansas
People from El Dorado, Arkansas
Hendrix College alumni